Jimmy C. Bales (September 25, 1935 – September 25, 2021) was an American politician. He served as a member of the South Carolina House of Representatives from the 80th District from 1999-2020. He is a member of the Democratic Party. Bales ran for re-election in 2020, but was defeated by Jermaine Johnson in the Democratic primary.

References

External links 
2007 Interview by former State newspaper editor Brad Warthen 

Notice of Jimmy Bales live stream funeral service by journalist Maayan Schechter, 2021

1935 births
2021 deaths
Democratic Party members of the South Carolina House of Representatives
21st-century American politicians
People from Rose Hill, Virginia